Cars of the Revolution is a 2008 Turkish drama film written and directed by Tolga Örnek. The film grossed $1.1 million after it was released to theatres on October 24, 2008.

Plot
The film is based on the development of the Devrim, the first ever automobile designed and produced in Turkey in 1961.

Cast 
Haluk Bilginer - Necip
Taner Birsel - Gunduz
Ali Düşenkalkar - Hayati
Halit Ergenç - Ugur
Altan Gördüm - Recep
Serhat Tutumluer - Ismet 
Onur Ünsal - Necip 
Selçuk Yöntem - Latif

References

External links 

2008 films
2000s historical drama films
Films set in 1961
Turkish historical drama films
2008 drama films
2000s Turkish-language films